Para table tennis at the 2021 Asian Youth Para Games was held in Bahrain between 3 and 4 December 2021.

Medal table

Medalists

Boy

Girl

References

External links
 Full Results
 Dec 03 - first day, single event
 Dec 04 - second day, single event

Asian Youth Para Games